Anak Jalanan: A New Beginning is an Indonesian television drama series produced by MNC Pictures. It premiered on 13 December 2021 on GTV. The series is a reboot of RCTI's Anak Jalanan. It stars Irsyadillah, Ersya Aurelia, Cemal Faruk, and Dea Annisa. The show last aired on 29 November 2022.

Synopsis
Boy is a young member of a motorcycle gang who falls in love with a beautiful girl named Reva. He believes his relationship with her can change his life for the better.

Main cast and characters
 Irsyadillah as Barra Agasatya
 Ersya Aurelia as Revalina "Reva" Amara
 Cemal Faruk as Marvel Rivano
 Dea Annisa as Amanda Clarissa

Production

Casting
Anrez Adelio held the role of Boy since the show launched in December 2021 but in August 2022, he quit the series. In September 2022, Irsyadillah replaced Adelio in the lead role, as Barra.

Soundtrack

References

Indonesian drama television series
Indonesian television soap operas